Erkki Ruoslahti (born 16 February 1940 in Imatra, Finland) is a cancer researcher and distinguished professor at Sanford Burnham Prebys Medical Discovery Institute. He moved from Finland to the United States in 1976.

Ruoslahti made seminal contributions to biology of extracellular matrix and its receptors.
He was one of the discoverers of fibronectin, an adhesion molecule and component of extracellular matrices, and he subsequently identified and cloned a number of other extracellular matrix components and adhesion molecules. In 1984, he identified the sequence within fibronectin that mediates cell attachment, called RGD for the amino acids of which it’s composed, and isolated the cellular receptors that bind that sequence, now known as integrins. The RGD discovery has led to the development of drugs for vascular thrombosis and cancer, among other diseases.

Ruoslahti currently studies specific marker molecules in blood vessels.  He introduced the concept of vascular "zip codes," the idea that each tissue bears molecular signatures that can be targeted by affinity ligands, and used in vivo peptide phage display to prove the concept and develop numerous tumor-homing peptides.

Education
Ruoslahti received his M.D. from the University of Helsinki in 1965 and his Ph.D. from the same institution in 1967. He completed postdoctoral studies at Caltech.

Career
Ruoslahti held various academic appointments with the University of Helsinki and the University of Turku in Finland and City of Hope National Medical Center in Duarte, California until joining the La Jolla Cancer Research Foundation (now Sanford Burnham Prebys Medical Discovery Institute, or SBP) in 1979. He served as SBP's president from 1989-2002, and was a distinguished professor at the University of California, Santa Barbara from 2005-2015.

Recent work on homing peptides and nanomedicine
Ruoslahti's research group has developed a novel class of tumor-homing peptides that can be used to enhance delivery of drugs and nanoparticles to tumors. These tumor-penetrating peptides selectively home to tumor vessels, where they activate a transport pathway that delivers the peptide, and along with it drugs and even nanoparticles, through the wall of tumor blood vessels and deep into tumor tissue. Having bound to tumor vessels the peptide is cleaved and an amino acid sequence motif named the C-end rule or CendR motif (pronounced "sender") is exposed at the C-terminus of the peptide. Subsequent binding of the peptide to neuropilin-1 activates the CendR transport pathway into and through tumor tissue.

The prototype tumor-penetrating peptide, iRGD, is in clinical trials in solid tumor patients tested as an enhancer of cancer therapies. This peptide recognizes many different types of cancers, and it can be used for tumor delivery of various payloads that are either coupled to the peptide, or given together with it.
iRGD has also been shown to effectively deliver drugs to the placenta, which could aid in the treatment of slow fetal growth.

Recently, in vivo phage screening has been used to identify peptides that target hypertensive pulmonary arteries, atherosclerosis, and diseases of the brain.

Awards and honors
 1990 - Robert J. and Claire Pasarow Foundation Medical Research Award
 1990 - American Association for Cancer Research - G.H.A. Clowes Memorial Award
 1991 - Honorary doctorate in medicine from Lund University, Sweden
 1995 - Nobel Fellow at the Karolinska Institutet in Stockholm
 1997 - Gairdner Foundation International Award
 1998 - Jacobaeus International Prize
 2003 - Jubilee Lecturer, Biochemical Society
 2005 - Japan Prize in Cell Biology
 2012 - Thomson Reuters Citation Laureate
 Knight of the Order of the White Rose of Finland
 Commander of the Order of the Lion of Finland
 2022 - Albert Lasker Award for Basic Medical Research.
 Member of
 National Academy of Sciences 
 National Academy of Medicine
 American Academy of Arts and Sciences
 European Molecular Biology Organization

References

American medical researchers
Living people
Members of the United States National Academy of Sciences
Finnish expatriates in the United States
1940 births
Members of the National Academy of Medicine
Recipients of the Albert Lasker Award for Basic Medical Research